Malva subovata, the tree mallow, is a species of flowering plant in the family Malvaceae, native to the shores of the western and central Mediterranean. As its synonym Lavatera maritima it has gained the Royal Horticultural Society's Award of Garden Merit.

Subtaxa
The following subspecies are accepted:
Malva subovata subsp. bicolor (Rouy) Iamonico
Malva subovata subsp. subovata

References

subovata
Flora of Southwestern Europe
Flora of Italy
Flora of Morocco
Flora of Algeria
Flora of Tunisia
Plants described in 2005